The Miniature Schnauzer is a breed of small dog of the Schnauzer type that originated in Germany in the mid-to-late 19th century. Miniature Schnauzers may have been developed from the smallest specimens of the Standard Schnauzer, or crosses between the standard and one or more smaller breeds such as the Affenpinscher, Miniature Pinscher, and Poodles, as farmers bred a small dog that was an efficient ratting dog. They are described as "spunky" but aloof dogs, with good guarding tendencies without some guard dogs' predisposition to bite. Miniature Schnauzers are recognized in four colors internationally: solid black, black and silver, salt and pepper, and white.

It is the most popular Schnauzer breed, and remains one of the most popular worldwide, primarily for its temperament and relatively small size. As of 2020 it is the 19th most popular breed in the U.S.

History
The earliest records surrounding the development of the Standard Schnauzer in Germany come from the late 19th century. They were originally bred to be medium-sized farm dogs in Germany, equally suited to ratting, herding, and guarding property. As time passed, farmers bred the Standard Schnauzer into a smaller, more compact size for ratting by combining it, according to cynologist theorization, with one or more small breeds such as the Affenpinscher and Miniature Poodle, Miniature Pinscher, or Pomeranian, or by chance from smallest specimens of the Standard Schnauzer. The first recorded Miniature Schnauzer appeared in 1888, black female named Findel, and the Pinscher-Schnauzer Klub (formed in 1895) in its first volume of the club's stud book mentioned Wirehaired Miniature Pinscher. The first exhibition was held in 1899.

The American Kennel Club accepted registration of the new breed in 1926, two years after Miniature Schnauzers were introduced to the United States. The American Miniature Schnauzer Club was formed in 1933, from the older parent club Wire-Haired Pinscher Club of America which also included Standard Schnauzer, and initially both competed in the Working Group until 1927. International Kennel Club classifications vary; by the VDH and FCI it is placed in "Group 2, Section 1: Pinschers and Schnauzers", with "Nr. 183" in "Section 1.2" dedicated to the Miniature Schnauzer breed, the KC, ANKC and NZKC include it in the Utility Group, while by the AKC, UKC and CKC the Miniature Schnauzer is classed in the Terrier Group.

The start of the modern Miniature Schnauzer in the United States is considered to have a beginning in 1924 when four dogs were imported from Germany. It is argued that almost all American-bred Miniatures partly descend from them, and between 1926 and 1936, 108 more dogs were imported. One of the most notable champions was Ch. Dorem Display, born in 1945 and lived to be nearly fourteen. It is claimed that many champion Miniature Schnauzers in America can trace its lineage back to Dorem Display.

Miniature Schnauzers were the 11th most popular breed in the U.S. in 2008, falling to 17th most popular in 2016.

Appearance

They have a double coat, with wiry exterior fur and a soft undercoat. In show trim, the coat is kept short on the body, but the fur on the ears, legs, belly, and face is retained. Recognized coat colors are black, pepper and salt, black and silver, and pure white; pepper and salt coloration is where coat hairs have banded shades of black, gray and silver, fading to a gray or silver at the eyebrows, whiskers, underbody and legs.

Miniature Schnauzers are often described as non-moulting dogs, and while this is not entirely true, their shedding is minimal and generally unnoticeable. For this reason, Schnauzers are considered a hypoallergenic breed. They are characterized by a rectangular head with bushy beard, mustache, and eyebrows; teeth that meet in a "scissor bite"; oval and dark colored eyes; and v-shaped, natural forward-folding ears (when cropped, the ears point straight upward and come to a sharp point). Their tails are naturally thin and short, and may be docked (where permitted). They will also have very straight, rigid front legs, and feet that are short and round (so-called "cat feet") with thick, black pads.

Docking of tails and cropping of ears has become a controversial practice, especially for non-working dogs, and is now illegal or restricted in a number of countries worldwide, including the UK and Australia.

Grooming
Schnauzers have a specific groom cut that is standard among the schnauzer breeds. Schnauzers require regular grooming, either by stripping, or by clipping. Stripping removes the loose, dead coat; it may be done by hand, called finger stripping, or plucking, or with a stripping knife; either way, it is a laborious process. When kept as pets, Miniature Schnauzers are often groomed differently (usually via clipping) from show dogs (often using stripping). Regular grooming of a Miniature Schnauzer is recommended approximately every six weeks. Clipping, using a mechanical clippers (or shaver), produces a soft, silky, skin-close trim. Whether stripped or clipped, the coat is close at the body, and falls into a fringe-like foundation on its undercarriage, called furnishings, which can be left to grow, but must be combed regularly. All schnauzers, whether they are Miniatures, Standards, or Giants, often sport a beard, created by allowing the hair around their noses to grow out.  Left unclipped or unstripped, the body hair will grow two to four inches, and will often tangle into mats and curls.

North American white coat controversy

White is one of four color varieties of the Miniature Schnauzer currently recognized by the Fédération Cynologique Internationale. However, they are not accepted for conformation showing by the American Kennel Club and Canadian Kennel Club. The controversy rests on the disputed origins of the white variation, namely whether it was contained within the genes of the originally recognized breed, or whether it was the result of subsequent modifications. Since the other two schnauzer types have never been available in a white variation, and the original German standard never included white as an acceptable color, the American Miniature Schnauzer Club chooses not to recognize white.

Temperament

The American Kennel Club breed standard describes temperament as "alert and spirited, yet obedient to command ... friendly, intelligent and willing to please... never overaggressive or timid". Usually easy to train, they tend to be excellent watchdogs with a good territorial instinct, but more inclined toward barking than biting. They are often aloof with strangers until the owners of the home welcome the guest, upon which they are typically very friendly to them. While the Miniature Schnauzer is included in the Terrier Group in North America (due to rat-catching background), it does not have common ancestry with Terriers from Great Britain, and compared to them has a different personality, being more laid back, obedient, friendly, and less aggressive to other dogs.

They are highly playful dogs, and, if not given the outlet required for their energy, they can become bored and invent their own "fun".  As an example: many Miniature Schnauzers enjoy playing with paper, and will happily shred wrapping paper, toilet paper, etc. if left unsupervised when bored or seeking attention. Miniature Schnauzers can compete in dog agility trials, obedience, showmanship, flyball, and tracking. Schnauzers have a high prey drive, which means they may chase other small animals and hence should not be off leash when not in a fenced area. Based on Stanley Coren's book The Intelligence of Dogs (2006) ranking methodology, the Miniature ranked 12th out of 140 breeds within 79 ranks on the ability to learn and obey new commands i.e. working and obedience intelligence, being grouped among "excellent working dogs". Additionally, experts ranked the Miniature as fifth among top 15 breeds at watchdog barking ability.

Health
A UK Kennel Club survey puts the median lifespan of Miniature Schnauzers at a little over 12 years. About 20% lived to >15 years. While generally a healthy breed, Miniature Schnauzers may suffer health problems associated with high fat levels. Such problems include hyperlipidemia, which may increase the possibility of pancreatitis, though either may form independently. Other issues which may affect this breed are diabetes, bladder stones and eye problems. Feeding the dog low- or non-fatty and unsweetened foods may help avoid these problems. Miniature Schnauzers are also prone to comedone syndrome, a condition that produces pus-filled bumps, usually on their backs, which can be treated with a variety of methods. Miniature Schnauzers should have their ears dried after swimming due to a risk of infection, especially those with natural ears; ear examinations should be part of the regular annual check up. Miniature Schnauzers are also prone to von Willebrand disease (vWD). vWD in dogs is an inherited bleeding disorder that occurs due to qualitative or quantitative deficiency of von Willebrand factor (vWF), a multimeric protein that is required for platelet adhesion.

See also
 Dutch Smoushond

References

External links

 

FCI breeds
Dog breeds originating in Germany
Companion dogs

de:Schnauzer#Zwergschnauzer